The 1961–62 Southern Football League season was the 59th in the history of the league, an English football competition.

Oxford United won the championship for the second successive season and was admitted to the Football League.

Premier Division
The Premier Division consisted of 22 clubs, including 18 clubs from the previous season and four new clubs, promoted from Division One:
Bexleyheath & Welling
Cambridge United
Kettering Town
Merthyr Tydfil

League table

Division One
Division One consisted of 20 clubs, including 17 clubs from the previous season and three new clubs, relegated from the Premier Division:
Dartford
Hastings United
Wisbech Town

League table

Football League elections
Due to the resignation of Accrington Stanley there was a free place in the Football League. Alongside the three League clubs facing re-election, a total of 26 non-League clubs applied for election, including 19 Southern League clubs. Southern League champions Oxford United were the only non-League club to be elected.

References

Southern Football League seasons
S